The Odette File Transfer Protocol (OFTP) is a protocol created in 1986, used for EDI (Electronic Data Interchange) between two communications business partners. Its name comes from the Odette Organisation (the Organization for data exchange by teletransmission in Europe).

The ODETTE File Transfer Protocol (ODETTE-FTP) was defined in 1986 by working group four of the Organisation for Data Exchange by Tele-Transmission in Europe (ODETTE) to address the electronic data interchange (EDI) requirements of the European automotive industry. It was designed in the spirit of the Open System Interconnection (OSI) model utilising the Network Service provided by the CCITT X.25 recommendation.

OFTP 2 was written in 2007 by Data Interchange, as a specification for the secure transfer of business documents over the Internet, ISDN and X.25 networks. A description of OFTP 1.3 can be found in RFC 2204, whilst OFTP 2 is defined in RFC 5024.

OFTP 2 can work point-to-point or indirectly via a VAN (Value Added Network). A single OFTP 2 entity can make and receive calls, exchanging files in both directions. This means that OFTP 2 can work in a push or pull mode, as opposed to AS2, which can only work in a push mode.

OFTP 2 can encrypt and digitally sign message data, request signed receipts and also offers high levels of data compression. All of these services are available when using OFTP 2 over TCP/IP, X.25/ISDN or native X.25. When used over a TCP/IP network such as the Internet, additional session level security is available by using OFTP 2 over Transport Layer Security (TLS).

OFTP 2 feature summary
 Message encryption
 Message signatures
 Signed receipts
 Message compression
 Message integrity
 Session authentication
 File & session level encryption (TLS)
 CMS envelopes
 Sub-level addressing

Advantages

 File restart
 Push / pull operation
 Peer-to-peer or indirect communications
 File compression
 Operates over TCP/IP, X.25/ISDN, native X.25
 Maximum file size of 9 PB (Petabytes)
 SHA-256 and PFS security

References

External links
 RFC5024 - OFTP 2, obsoletes RFC2204
 RFC2204 - ODETTE File Transfer Protocol
 OFTP 2 Whitepaper
 OFTP2 Documentation
 Odette Website

Open source software
 Accord Odette OFTP2
 mendelson Open Source OFTP2

Commercial software
 Rocket Software • Eurex-c EDI and CAD data exchange solutions via OFTP2
 TRUfusion Enterprise • CAD/PLM data exchange solutions using OFTP2
 STCP OFTP Suite - Product Suite for process integration and EDI
 i-effect • Integrated Solutions for IBM i (AS2, OFTP2, OFTP, etc.)
 Bartsch Software !MC5 (OFTP, OFTP2, EDI converter, ...)
 rvs from T-Systems-International GmbH
 ArcESB MFT
 FT-Master from NUMLOG
 Darwin, Epic and Odex by Data Interchange Plc
 ET-Connector EDI Integration suite
 Encode Networks Svenska AB
 OS4X - The Odette System for Unix
 HUENGSBERG - engDAX with OFTP2
 EDICOM OFTP2 SERVER
 xTrade Business Communications Suite
 TX2 CONCEPT
 Avenum EDI as a Service (AS2, OFTP, Mail, VAN etc.)
 ipOFTP • Appliance with OFTP protocol and EDI functionality built in

Application layer protocols
Clear text protocols
Internet protocols
Internet Standards
Network protocols
Network file transfer protocols
Unix network-related software